An electronic organizer (or electric organizer) is a small calculator-sized computer, often with an built-in diary application and other functions such as an address book and calendar, replacing paper-based personal organizers. Typically, it has a small alphanumeric keypad and an LCD screen of one, two, or three lines. The electronic diary or organizer was invented by Indian businessman Satyan Pitroda in 1975, who is regarded as one of the earliest pioneers of hand-held computing because of his invention of the Electronic Diary in 1975.

They were very popular especially with businessmen during the 1990s, but because of the advent of palmtop PCs in the 1990s, personal digital assistants in the 2000s, and smartphones in the 2010s, all of which have a larger set of features, electronic organizers are mostly seen today for research purposes. One of the leading research topics being the study of how electronics can help people with mental disabilities use this type of equipment to aid their daily life.  Electronic organizers have more recently been used to support people with Alzheimer's disease to have a visual representation of a schedule.

Casio digital diary
Casio digital diaries were produced by Casio in the early and mid 1990s, but have since been entirely superseded by Mobile Phones and PDAs.

Other electronic organizers 
While Casio was a major role player in the field of electronic organizers there were many different ideas, patent requests, and manufacturers of electronic organizers. Rolodex, widely known for their index card holders in the 1980s, Sharp Electronics, mostly known for their printers and audio visual equipment, and lastly Royal electronics were all large contributors to the electronic organizer in its heyday.

Features
 Telephone directory
 Schedule keeper: Keep track of appointments.
 Memo function: Store text data such as price lists, airplane schedules, and more.
 To do list: Keep track of daily tasks, checking off items as you complete them.
 World time: Find out the current time in virtually any location on the globe.
 Secret memory area: The secret memory area keeps personal data private. Once a password is registered, data is locked away until the password is used to access the secret area.
 Alarm
 Metric conversion function: Conversion between metric units and another measurement unit.
 Currency conversion function
 Game: Some machines included a game such as Poker or Blackjack.

See also
 Pocket electronic dictionary
 Personal digital assistant (PDA)
 Smartphone
 Pocket computer

References

External links

Mobile computers